Euxestina similis is a species of ulidiid or picture-winged fly in the genus Euxestina of the family Tephritidae.

References

Ulidiidae
Insects described in 1937